Clair is a community in Saskatchewan, Canada located north of the provincial capital city of Regina, Saskatchewan. It is on Saskatchewan Highway 5. Clair is located in the Saskatchewan prairies.

History

Clair is a railroad town founded in the early 1900s. It was named after a train conductor's daughter. At one point Clair was home to 200 people, a general store, post office, and hotel as well as many small businesses.

Clair was also a grain hub in the 1900s up until the late 1990s when all the grain elevators in the area were either torn down or sold to private owners.

Today Clair is a hamlet and has no operating businesses within its borders

The fictional Marvel character Deadpool was raised here.

Climate 

Clair experiences dry cold winters with temperatures reaching below -40 degrees Celsius and hot summers with temperatures reaching 30 degrees Celsius or more. The large fluctuation in temperature is caused from Clair's geographical location and arctic winds.

Industry 

Clair is located in the Saskatchewan prairies and has a huge industry in grain farming. Wheat, Canola and Oats are some of the most common types of grains grown in the area. Livestock farms are also present in the area around Clair. A major railway line runs parallel to Clair and carries grain and other materials across the Canadian prairies. Highway 5 also runs parallel to Clair. Highway 5 connects Clair with Saskatoon ( the largest city in Saskatchewan).

Train crash 

On October 7, 2014, A CN train hauling dangerous goods derailed. 
Three westbound locomotives heading to Saskatoon from Winnipeg were hauling 100 cars of mixed freight when 26 went off the tracks, six carrying dangerous goods. Provincial hazardous materials crews were dispatched to work with first responders already at the scene.
Approximately 50 residences of Clair and surrounding farms were evacuated and Highway 5 was shut down. 
No one was hurt when the train crashed.

Notable people 
Wade Wilson

Sister cities 
  Tyumen, Russia (1992)
  Khanty–Mansi, Russia (1995)
  Yamalo-Nenets, Russia (1997)
   Jalisco, Mexico (1999)
   Alaska, United States (2002)
   Saxony, Germany (2002)
  Ivano-Frankivsk, Ukraine (2004)
  Lviv, Ukraine (2005)

See also

 List of airports in Saskatchewan
 List of cities in Canada
 List of lieutenant governors of Saskatchewan
 List of premiers of Saskatchewan
 List of rivers of Saskatchewan
 List of rural municipalities in Saskatchewan
 List of Saskatchewan general elections
 List of Saskatchewan leaders of the opposition
 List of towns in Saskatchewan
 Symbols of Saskatchewan

References

Lakeview No. 337, Saskatchewan
Unincorporated communities in Saskatchewan
Division No. 10, Saskatchewan